Creochiton is a genus of flowering plant belonging to the family Melastomataceae.

Its native range is Tropical Asia.

Species:

Creochiton anomala 
Creochiton bibracteata 
Creochiton bracteata 
Creochiton brevibracteata 
Creochiton diptera 
Creochiton divitiflora 
Creochiton furfuracea 
Creochiton kinabaluense 
Creochiton ledermannii 
Creochiton monticola 
Creochiton novoguineensis 
Creochiton pudibunda 
Creochiton rosea 
Creochiton schlechteri 
Creochiton turbinatus

References

Melastomataceae
Melastomataceae genera